That's What Daddy Wants is the second album by the American country musician Wayne Hancock, released in 1997. It was his first to be released on Ark21.

Production
Recorded in three days, the album was produced by Lloyd Maines. Joel Guzman played accordion on "87 Southbound". "Brand New Cadillac" was initially recorded for a Clash tribute album. Hancock used a drummer on three songs.

Critical reception

The Washington Post stated: "As a songwriter, Hancock simply recycles the two-step rhythms, three-chord changes, 12-bar blues, four-lane highways and two-women troubles of his favorite old records. He invests this ordinary material with exceptional life, however, thanks to the irresistible vitality of his vocals." The Los Angeles Times thought that the album "may be edgy, but it's the edginess of a guy having a good time playing music that's all the more fun because it is so out of step with the mannerly country music of current fashion."

AllMusic wrote that "retro is perfectly fine when it's done as well as this."

Track listing
All songs written by Wayne Hancock; except where noted 
 "That's What Daddy Wants" – 3:32
 "87 Southbound" – 3:32
 "Johnson City" – 5:15
 "Misery" – 2:30
 "Little Lisa" – 1:47
 "Knocked Out Rhythm" – 5:14
 "Highway 54" – 2:54
 "Johnny Law" – 4:13
 "Freight Line Blues" – 2:41
 "Lea Ann" – 4:06
 "Life On The Road" – 3:29
 "Louisiana Blues" – 4:44
 "Brand New Cadillac" (Vince Taylor) – 4:39

Personnel 

Wayne Hancock – Acoustic Guitar and vocals
Lisa Pankratz – Drums
Bill Bratcher – Bass
Ric Ramerez – Bass
Paul Skelton – Guitar
Dave Biller – Guitar
Chris Miller – Steel Guitar
Lloyd Maines – Acoustic Guitar
Bob Stafford – Trombone
Stan Smith – Clarinet
Gary Slechta – Trumpet
Ephrain Owens – Trumpet
Joel Guzman – Accordion
Backing Vocals – The Tap Room Choir Featuring: The Skipper, The Big Kahuna, and Slowpitch

References

External links
 Wayne "The Train" Hancock's Official web site  
 Wayne Hancock on rockabilly.net 
 Wayne Hancock collection at the Internet Archive's live music archive

Wayne Hancock albums
1997 albums